The Canton of Avesnes-le-Comte  is a canton situated in the department of the Pas-de-Calais and in the Hauts-de-France region of northern France.

Geography 

The canton is organized around Avesnes-le-Comte in the arrondissement of Arras.

Composition
At the French canton reorganisation which came into effect in March 2015, the canton was expanded from 31 to 108 communes:

Adinfer
Agnez-lès-Duisans
Agnières
Ambrines
Amplier
Aubigny-en-Artois
Avesnes-le-Comte
Bailleul-aux-Cornailles
Bailleulmont
Bailleulval
Barly
Basseux
Bavincourt
Beaudricourt
Beaufort-Blavincourt
Berlencourt-le-Cauroy
Berles-au-Bois
Berles-Monchel
Berneville
Béthonsart
Bienvillers-au-Bois
Blairville
Boiry-Sainte-Rictrude
Boiry-Saint-Martin
Cambligneul
Camblain-l'Abbé
Canettemont
Capelle-Fermont
La Cauchie
Chelers
Couin
Coullemont
Couturelle
Denier
Duisans
Estrée-Wamin
Famechon
Ficheux
Foncquevillers
Fosseux
Frévillers
Frévin-Capelle
Gaudiempré
Givenchy-le-Noble
Gommecourt
Gouves
Gouy-en-Artois
Grand-Rullecourt
Grincourt-lès-Pas
Habarcq
Halloy
Hannescamps
Haute-Avesnes
Hauteville
Hébuterne
Hendecourt-lès-Ransart
Hénu
La Herlière
Hermaville
Houvin-Houvigneul
Humbercamps
Ivergny
Izel-lès-Hameau
Lattre-Saint-Quentin
Liencourt
Lignereuil
Magnicourt-en-Comte
Magnicourt-sur-Canche
Maizières
Manin
Mingoval
Monchiet
Monchy-au-Bois
Mondicourt
Montenescourt
Noyellette
Noyelle-Vion
Orville
Pas-en-Artois
Penin
Pommera
Pommier
Puisieux
Ransart
Rebreuve-sur-Canche
Rebreuviette
Rivière
Sailly-au-Bois
Saint-Amand
Sars-le-Bois
Sarton
Saulty
Savy-Berlette
Simencourt
Sombrin
Souastre
Le Souich
Sus-Saint-Léger
Thièvres
Tilloy-lès-Hermaville
Tincques
Villers-Brûlin
Villers-Châtel
Villers-Sir-Simon
Wanquetin
Warlincourt-lès-Pas
Warlus
Warluzel

Population

See also
Cantons of Pas-de-Calais 
Communes of Pas-de-Calais 
Arrondissements of the Pas-de-Calais department

References

Avesnes-le-Comte